Raja Shankar Shah University, formerly known as Chhindwara University, is a state university in Chhindwara, Madhya Pradesh, India.

Affiliated colleges
The university has jurisdiction over four districts, Balaghat, Betul, Chhindwara and Seoni.

References

External links
 

Universities in Madhya Pradesh
Chhindwara
Educational institutions established in 2019
2019 establishments in Madhya Pradesh